Aimery I of Narbonne, son of Bernard Berenger of Narbonne and Foy of Rouergue. He was viscount of Narbonne 1071 until his death in the Holy Land in 1106.

Biography 
Quite young when his father Viscount Bernard died, the first years of Aymeri take place in the shadow of his uncle, Pierre Bérenger, who asserted his hold on Narbonne both as viscount and as archbishop of Narbonne, despite the opposition of the pope and his legates. The government of Aymeri is especially marked by its clashes with the archbishops Dalmace of Narbonne and Bertrand of Montredon for the control of Narbonne.

According to a missing charter referred to in later documents, in 1093 Aymeri I authorized a group of Benedictine monks to settle in the forest of Fontfroide, a modest starting point for what would later become the one of the most powerful monasteries in the region, Cistercian Abbey of Fontfroide.

Leaving for the Holy Land around 1103, Viscount Aymeri I died soon after. His eldest son Aymeri II succeeded him.

Marriage and descent 
Between 1085 and 1087, he married Mahaut of Apulia, daughter of Robert Guiscard, duke of Apulia. They had:
 Aimery II (died in 1134), viscount of Narbonne, his successor
 Bernard, also says Bernard Raimond (attested in 1103)
 Guiscard (attested in 1103)
 Bérenger (died in 1162), first monk at the abbey of Saint-Pons-de-Thomières (1103), and then abbot de Lagrasse (1114 / 1117-1156) and Archbishop of Narbonne (1156-1162)

Notes

Sources

11th-century births
1106 deaths
Viscounts of Narbonne
11th-century French people
12th-century French people